AD 40 (XL) was a leap year starting on Friday (link will display the full calendar) of the Julian calendar. At the time, it was known as the Year of the Consulship of Augustus without colleague (or, less frequently, year 793 Ab urbe condita). The denomination AD 40 for this year has been used since the Early Middle Ages, when the Anno Domini calendar era became the prevalent method in Europe for naming years.

Events

By place

Roman Empire 
 Emperor Caligula is consul without colleague.
 Caligula starts on a campaign to conquer Britain, which fails miserably. He declares himself victorious regardless.
 Noricum and Mauretania are incorporated into the Roman Empire.
 Caligula reforms the principatus into a Hellenistic Autocracy. He distributes honors carelessly, declares himself a god and orders that all the heads of the Greek deity statues be replaced by his. He also appoints his horse, Incitatus,  a senator.
 Approximate date of start of construction on the Pont du Gard aqueduct in Gallia Narbonensis.

Europe 
 The Germanic Quadi tribe begin settling in present-day Moravia and Slovakia.

Parthia 
 Vardanes I becomes king of Parthia, opposed by his brother Gotarzes II.

Vietnam 
 The Vietnamese Trưng Sisters rebel against the rule of the Chinese Emperor Guang Wu of Han.

By topic

Arts and sciences 
 Philo teaches that all men are born free.

Religion 
 Christianity comes to Egypt as a church is founded in Alexandria. Mark the Evangelist founds the Church of Alexandria as the first Patriarch.
 An early Christian church is erected at Corinth (most probable date).
 The traditional date of Saint James the Great meeting Our Lady of the Pillar in Spain

Births 
 June 13 – Gnaeus Julius Agricola, Roman governor (d. AD 93)
 Claudia Octavia, daughter of Claudius and Messalina (d. AD 62)
 Dio Chrysostom, Greek philosopher and historian (d. c. 115)
 Ma, Chinese empress of the Han Dynasty (d. AD 79)
 Pedanius Dioscorides, Greek physician and pharmacologist (d. AD 90)
 Sextus Julius Frontinus, Roman general and military author (d. 103)
 Titus Petronius Secundus, Roman prefect (d. AD 97)

Deaths 
 Gnaeus Domitius Ahenobarbus, husband of Agrippina the Younger (b. 17 BC)
 Faustus Cornelius Sulla, Roman politician and suffect consul
 Ptolemy of Mauretania, Roman client king  (executed by Caligula)

References 

0040